The Laureus World Sports Award for Sportsman of the Year is an annual award honouring the achievements of individual men from the world of sports. It was first awarded in 2000 as one of the seven constituent awards presented during the Laureus World Sports Awards. The awards are presented by the Laureus Sport for Good Foundation, a global organisation involved in more than 150 charity projects supporting 500,000 young people. The first ceremony was held on 25 May 2000 in Monte Carlo, at which Nelson Mandela gave the keynote speech. , a shortlist of six nominees for the award comes from a panel composed of the "world's leading sports editors, writers and broadcasters". The Laureus World Sports Academy then selects the winner who is presented with a Laureus statuette, created by Cartier, at the annual awards ceremony held in various locations around the world. The awards are considered highly prestigious and are frequently referred to as the sporting equivalent of "Oscars".

The inaugural winner of the award was the American golfer Tiger Woods who finished the 1999 season with eight wins, a feat not achieved since 1974, including the PGA Championship. He went on to become the most dominant player of his era, earning a second Laureus Award the following year, and five further nominations between 2002 and 2008. The 2003 winner of the Laureus World Sports Award for Sportsman of the Year was the American road cyclist Lance Armstrong. He had been nominated the previous year, and earned further nominations in 2004, 2005 and 2006. Following Armstrong's 2013 admission of doping, all his Laureus awards and nominations were rescinded. Tennis players dominate the winners list, with eleven awards, while athletes and Formula One drivers have won four times, and golfers twice. Excluding Armstrong, the Laureus World Sports Award for Sportsman of the Year has been won by just nine individuals since its inception. Roger Federer holds the record for the most awards with five. The 2022 award was won by Dutch racing driver Max Verstappen.

List of winners and nominees

Statistics
Statistics are correct as of 2022 nominations.

References

External links
 Official website

Sportsman of the Year
Awards established in 2000
2000 sports awards